The Colsterdale Marine Beds is a geologic formation in North Yorkshire, England. It is exposed in Colsterdale and upper Nidderdale, and preserves fossils dating back to the Carboniferous period.

See also

 List of fossiliferous stratigraphic units in England

References

 

Carboniferous System of Europe
Carboniferous England
Geology of North Yorkshire